The first season of the AMC American crime drama television series The Killing premiered on April 3, 2011 and concluded on June 19, 2011. The series was developed and produced by Veena Sud and based on the Danish series, Forbrydelsen (The Crime). Set in Seattle, Washington, this season follows the investigation into the murder of local teenager Rosie Larsen, with each episode covering approximately 24 hours. The first season covers the first two weeks of the investigation and has three main storylines: the police investigation into Rosie's murder, the attempts of her family to deal with their grief, and the fluctuating electoral fortunes of a political campaign that becomes embroiled in the case. It stars Mireille Enos as homicide detective Sarah Linden and Joel Kinnaman as rookie detective Stephen Holder.

Cast

Main 
 Mireille Enos as Sarah Linden, the lead homicide detective
 Billy Campbell as Darren Richmond, politician running for mayor of Seattle
 Joel Kinnaman as Stephen Holder, Sarah's homicide detective partner
 Michelle Forbes as Mitch Larsen, Rosie's mother
 Brent Sexton as Stanley Larsen, Rosie's father
 Kristin Lehman as Gwen Eaton, Darren's lover and his campaign adviser
 Eric Ladin as Jamie Wright, Darren's campaign manager
 Brendan Sexton III as Belko Royce, Stan's co-worker and close friend
 Jamie Anne Allman as Terry Marek, Mitch's younger sister and Rosie's aunt
 Annie Corley as Regi Darnell, Sarah's social worker and mother figure

Recurring

Plot 
Set in Seattle, Washington, the series follows the investigation into the murder of local teenager Rosie Larsen, with each episode covering approximately 24 hours. The first season covers the first two weeks of the investigation and has three main storylines: the police investigation of Rosie's murder, the attempts of her family to deal with their grief, and the fluctuating electoral fortunes of a political campaign that becomes embroiled in the case.

The main character is Sarah Linden (Mireille Enos), an experienced homicide detective who is about to retire at a young age to follow her fiancé (Callum Keith Rennie) to Sonoma, California. On her last day on the job, Linden is partnered with rookie homicide detective Stephen Holder (Joel Kinnaman), who has recently transferred from an undercover assignment in vice and narcotics. Holder's erratic and aggressive style contrasts with Linden's more reserved demeanor. The two are sent to investigate a possible crime scene in a local wilderness park, where a bloody woman's shirt and a credit card belonging to Stan Larsen (Brent Sexton) have been discovered. The detectives talk to Larsen's wife Mitch (Michelle Forbes), who reveals that the family has just returned from a weekend camping trip and their seventeen-year-old daughter Rosie had not gone with them. It soon turns out that no one seems to know where Rosie was, and her father Stan and the police frantically search for her. Eventually, a car belonging to the mayoral campaign of city councilman Darren Richmond (Billy Campbell) is pulled from a lake in the park, and Rosie is discovered dead in the trunk.

As the Larsen family tries to cope with its grief, police suspicion initially focuses on Rosie's rich, dissolute boyfriend Jasper and his drug dealing friend Kris, who had been at a party with Rosie the night she went missing. This suspicion only increases when a video surfaces of Jasper and Kris having sex with someone wearing Rosie's Halloween costume, and blood is discovered in the room where the video was shot. However, one of Rosie's friends comes forward to admit that it was her on the tape.

The police next begin to suspect Rosie's English teacher Bennet Ahmed (Brandon Jay McLaren), after the police discover that he had written her letters and is now married to a woman who used to be one of his students. Police suspicion grows after it is discovered that Rosie had visited Bennet's house the night she disappeared, and that Bennet had lied about the visit. The police's interest in Bennet is leaked to the press, resulting in attacks on Bennet's mosque. The revelation also damages the Richmond campaign, as Bennet had worked as a volunteer at a community program sponsored by Richmond, and the candidate refuses to denounce him without proof of his guilt. After the police fail to obtain enough evidence to arrest Bennet, Mitch Larsen goads her husband, who had previously worked as an enforcer for a local criminal syndicate, into savagely beating Bennet, leaving the man in a coma.  However, the police soon discover Bennet is innocent, when a friend who was at Bennet's house provides him with an alibi. On discovering Bennet's innocence, Stan Larsen turns himself in to the authorities.

Now without a prime suspect, the police discover Rosie had been making trips to a Native American casino located on an unnamed island in Puget Sound, where she had been making regular deposits into a secret bank account she had opened under the name of her aunt Terry (Jamie Anne Allman). Terry, it is discovered, had been working as a prostitute for a high-end escort service, which the police suspect Rosie may have been involved in as well. From Terry, the police learn of an intimidating client who had threatened to drown another prostitute. They soon discover this client is Darren Richmond. Richmond had earlier been eliminated as a suspect because his campaign manager (Kristin Lehman), with whom he was romantically involved, had provided him with an alibi. However, after discovering Richmond has been engaging in other romantic relationships, she tells the police Richmond was gone for several hours the night Rosie was murdered. Later, Holder provides them with a photograph from a toll booth camera showing Richmond leaving the casino in the car in which Rosie was found. The police arrest Richmond, potentially destroying his campaign, while Linden boards a plane to Sonoma with her son. Richmond is shown in a perp walk outside the police station. Belko Royce (Brendan Sexton III), a family friend of the Larsens, and a suspect in the case, approaches Richmond and draws a gun.

The season one finale ends with a plot twist. As her plane readies for takeoff, Linden receives a phone call from the state police informing her the toll booth cameras, from which Holder had supposedly gotten the incriminating photograph of Richmond, have been broken for months and no footage is available; she therefore realizes the photograph was falsified evidence and the case against Richmond is compromised. Meanwhile, Holder meets with an unidentified person with whom he discusses his falsification of this evidence.

Crew
Series developer Veena Sud also served as executive producer and showrunner of the first season, she wrote three episodes, including the pilot episode, and she co-wrote the season finale. The remaining writing staff consisted of co-executive producers Dawn Prestwich and Nicole Yorkin, who co-wrote two episodes together; consulting producer Aaron Zelman, who wrote a single episode; and co-producer Jeremy Doner, who wrote two episodes. The other episodes were written by freelance writers: Soo Hugh and Nic Pizzolatto each wrote two episodes, while Linda Burstyn and Dan Nowak each wrote one. Kristen Campo served as producer, while Mikkel Bondesen, along with producers from the original Danish series, Søren Sveistrup, Piv Bernth, and Ingolf Gabold, were executive producers.

Patty Jenkins directed the pilot, Ed Bianchi directed three episodes in season one, Agnieszka Holland directed two episodes, and Gwyneth Horder-Payton, Jennifer Getzinger, Phil Abraham, Dan Attias, Nicole Kassell, Keith Gordon, and Brad Anderson each directed one of the remaining episodes.

Episodes

Production 
The pilot was ordered by AMC in January 2010, and then was picked up for a full series order in August 2010. The series is filmed in Vancouver, British Columbia, and production began on the pilot episode on December 2, 2010. The pilot is written by series creator and executive producer Veena Sud and is directed by Patty Jenkins.

In contrast to the original Danish series, executive producer Veena Sud explained, "We're creating our own world. We are using the Danish series as a blueprint, but we are kind of diverging and creating our own world, our world of suspects and, potentially, ultimately who killed Rosie Larsen." Sud describes the series as "slow-burn storytelling in a sense that every moment that we don't have to prettify or gloss over or make something necessarily easy to digest, that we're able to go to all sorts of places that are honest, and dark, and beautiful and tragic, in a way that is how a story should be told."

Reception

Critical reception 
The series premiere received universal acclaim from critics, and received a Metacritic score of 84 out of 100 based on 29 reviews. Tim Goodman of The Hollywood Reporter gave the series a very positive review, calling it "excellent, absorbing and addictive. When each episode ends, you long for the next — a hallmark of great dramas." Goodman also praised Mireille Enos' performance as the lead character Sarah, saying "It's not until you watch Enos play Sarah for a while that it sinks in — there hasn't been a female American character like her probably ever." Entertainment Weeklys Ken Tucker gave it a B+, saying "The acting is strikingly good" and that "Some viewers may find The Killing a little too cold and deliberate, but give it time. Its intensity builds steadily, giving the series unexpected power." Alex Strachan of The Vancouver Sun says the series "is soaked in atmosphere and steeped in the stark realism of Scandinavian crime novelists Henning Mankell and Stieg Larsson" and that it "is not as much about a young girl's murder as it is a psychological study of what happens afterward, how a tight-knit community tries to recover and how a dead child's mother, father and siblings learn to deal with their pain in their own private ways." Matt Roush of TV Guide applauded the series, calling the acting "tremendous" and that he "was instantly hooked by the moody atmosphere of this season-long murder mystery set in Seattle." He went on to say "What really stands out for me, in this age of cookie-cutter procedurals, is how The Killing dramatizes the devastation a violent death has on a family, a community, on the people involved in the investigation. Nothing about this show is routine."

Subsequent episodes were met with lesser praise by some critics, criticizing the show's reliance upon increasingly implausible red herrings to drive each episode and the withholding of details about each character's background, especially Rosie's, thus making them difficult to relate to or empathize with. The first-season finale was met with negative reviews from a number of critics. The Los Angeles Times called it "one of the most frustrating finales in TV history", with Alan Sepinwall of HitFix calling the end "insulting". Finally, Maureen Ryan of AOL TV said the season "killed off any interest I had in ever watching the show again." "[The show] began last spring looking like the smartest, most stylish pilot in years," complained Heather Havrilevsky in The New York Times Magazine. "Fast-forward to the finale, in which we learn that what we've been watching is actually a 26-hour-long episode of Law & Order, and we're only halfway through it."

Ratings 
When it premiered, the pilot was AMC's second-highest original series premiere following The Walking Dead. The premiere drew 2.7 million viewers and a 2 household rating. The two encores of the premiere episode brought the ratings of the premiere up to a total of 4.6 million total viewers and a 3.7 household rating. The UK premiere on Channel 4 brought in 2.2 million viewers.

Awards and nominations

Home media releases
The first season of The Killing was released on DVD and Blu-ray Disc on March 13, 2012 in region 1. The set includes all 13 episodes, an extended version of the season finale, two audio commentaries, a featurette called "An Autopsy of The Killing", deleted scenes and bloopers.

References

External links 
 

The Killing (American TV series)
2011 American television seasons